The Russian Open Hockey Championship, also known as the Championship of Russia in ice hockey, is an annual ice hockey award and national title, bestowed by the Ice Hockey Federation of Russia to the professional hockey organization judged to have the best performing team in Russia.

History
The Russian Championship (formerly Soviet Championship) has acted as the national ice hockey title of Russia since 1946. The Cup of Russia acted as an independent league title awarded in the Russian Hockey League first in 1997–98, before being merged with the Russian Championship. The recipient team of the Cup is awarded an engraved trophy, whereas the top-3 finalists of the Russian Championship are awarded gold, silver, and bronze medals. During the existence of the Russian Championship, several separate league trophies have been handed out intermittently, including the Soviet Cup (USSR), IHL Cup, and currently the Gagarin Cup (KHL).

Historically the title of Champion of Russia was awarded to the club with the best record in the regular season; but the last such case was in 2014–15 KHL season. Starting from the 2015–16 KHL season, the Russian Championship is awarded to the highest-ranked Russian team of the playoffs. 2019–20 KHL season was prematurely ended due to the 2020 coronavirus pandemic in Europe, and medals were awarded based on performance of clubs in the regular championships and in first round of the Gagarin Cup playoffs.

Until 2011–12 KHL season, non-Russian KHL teams were also eligible for Russian Championship. The winner of the regular season receives the Continental Cup (Russian: Кубок Континента, Kubok Kontinenta).

CSKA Moscow has won the most national titles, with 36, and Soviet Cups, with 12.

List of champions
Key

Medal summary by club

 bold – club is currently member of KHL

 italics – indicates club does not exist anymore

 [*] – non-Russian based club

References

General
 Russian Championship statistics

External links
 fhr.ru Ice Hockey Federation of Russia official site 

Russian ice hockey trophies and awards
Ice hockey statistics
Soviet Hockey League
Kontinental Hockey League
Russian Superleague
International Hockey League (1992–1996)
National championships in Russia